Andacollo is a city and commune in the Elqui Province, Coquimbo Region, Chile.

History

Andacollo is a copper and gold mining city located in the mountains of the Small North (El Norte Chico) in Chile. It was founded in 1891.

Several legends are told about the name of the city. Some say that it comes from the Quechua Anta-Goya which means cobre-reina (copper queen). Others say that the name means "Hurry up, Collo" (Anda, Collo). According to these legends, La Virgen del Rosario, also known as la Virgen Morena, or Black Madonna, appeared to an indigenous miner called "Collo" in the form of a small wooden statuette hidden in rocks. The statue told the newly converted Collo to build up a church at the place where Andacollo is located today. As many miracles are attributed to the Dark Lady (like stopping the smallpox epidemic of 1871) the city celebrates the Virgin every year on December 24 to 26.

Demographics
According to the 2002 census of the National Statistics Institute, Andacollo had 10,288 inhabitants (5,148 men and 5,140 women). Of these, 9,444 (91.8%) lived in urban areas and 844 (8.2%) in rural areas. The population fell by 16% (1,958 persons) between the 1992 and 2002 censuses.

Administration
As a commune, Andacollo is a third-level administrative division of Chile administered by a municipal council, headed by an alcalde who is directly elected every four years.

Within the electoral divisions of Chile, Andacollo is represented in the Chamber of Deputies by Mr. Mario Bertolino (RN) and Marcelo Díaz (PS) as part of the 7th electoral district, (together with La Serena, La Higuera, Vicuña and Paiguano). The commune is represented in the Senate by Evelyn Matthei Fornet (UDI) and Jorge Pizarro Soto (PDC) as part of the 4th senatorial constituency (Coquimbo Region).

Gallery

References

External links

  Municipality of Andacollo

Communes of Chile
Populated places in Elqui Province
1891 establishments in Chile